Hillside Cemetery is a historic cemetery in Anniston, Alabama. It was established in 1876, and laid out by Nathan Franklin Barrett. It has been listed on the National Register of Historic Places since October 3, 1985.

Notable burials include US Representative Fred L. Blackmon (1873–1921) and Civil War general Daniel Tyler (1799–1882). Robert Ernest Noble a physician and United States Army officer who attained the rank of major general is also buried at Hillside.

The Temple Beth El section of the cemetery was designated as an Alabama Historical Cemetery on October 15, 2008.

References

External links
 
 

National Register of Historic Places in Calhoun County, Alabama
Buildings and structures completed in 1876
Cemeteries on the National Register of Historic Places in Alabama
Cemeteries established in the 1870s
Buildings and structures in Anniston, Alabama
1876 establishments in Alabama